Arragonia is a moth genus in the family Autostichidae.

Species
 Arragonia anatolica Gozmány, 1986
 Arragonia kautzi (Rebel, 1928)
 Arragonia punctivittellus (Zerny, 1927)
 Arragonia tunesiella Amsel, 1942

References

Holcopogoninae